Kevin Lyman is the founder and operator of the Kevin Lyman Group, formerly known as 4Fini, Inc., a live event production company and brand strategy firm. His most notable live production is the live music festival series Vans Warped Tour, which attracted about 750,000 people annually and was the longest-running North American festival concert tour. 

In the Fall Semester of 2018, Lyman started teaching at USC's Thornton School of Music as an Associate Professor.

Education
Kevin Lyman is a graduate of California State Polytechnic University, Pomona, with a degree in Recreation Administration.

Career tours and festivals

Active tours/festivals

Previous tours and productions
Vans Warped Tour 1995-2019
Watcha! Tour
Taste Of Chaos Festival
INTOUR 
It’s Not Dead Festival
Vans European Warped Tour
The Rockstar Energy Mayhem Festival
Australian Warped Tour
Vans Warped Tour Japan
Country Throwdown Tour
Down From The Mountain Tour
Taste Of Chaos
Lolapallooza (’91-’94)
J-Rock Revolution
NIN (Downward Spiral Tour)
Delta Heavy Tour
Sprite Liquid Mix Tour
This is Why Wurr Hot Tour
Great High Mountain Tour
Crusty Demons Global Assault Tour
X-Files EXP Tour
Vans Triple Crown
Duffing for Dollars Charity Golf Tournament
Eat’M Conference (Las Vegas)
Christopher Street West Gay & Lesbian Pride Festival
Boarding for Breast Cancer Foundation Snowboard and Music Festival
Girlz Garage
Neil Bogart Foundation Gala
Z-100 "Z Zoo Plane to Puerto Rico" Event
"320 Festival" for Mental Health a partnership with Talinda Bennington
Recover Outloud Broadcast Las Vegas Fall 2020

Other productions

In 2014, 4Fini produced the first Alternative Press (AP) Music Awards show.
Revolver Golden God Awards

Filmography

Lyman has appeared in and produced multiple TV series, movies, and documentaries including FUSE TV’s series Warped Roadies (from 2012-2014), No Room For Rockstars (documentary), The Other F Word (documentary), and Alternative Press’s annual AP Music Award Show (2014). He is also producing the upcoming animated musical comedy Under The Boardwalk, from Paramount Animation

Kevin Lyman Group Agency
In 2018 after the final cross country run of the Vans Warped Tour, Lyman rebranded and started the Kevin Lyman Group Agency, a talent and brand strategy agency focused on the festival landscape. The KLG team is composed of Lyman - CEO and founder, Kate Truscott - General Manager, Steph Mirsky - Marketing and Creative Director, Mel Pierce - Operations Manager, and Kat Cody - Project Coordinator.

4Fini Incorporated

Founded by Lyman, 4Fini is a talent and brand strategy agency (4Fini Agency) and event production company (4Fini Productions) based in South Pasadena, California.  In addition, the company has an office in Nashville, Tennessee, which handles sponsorship, marketing, and operations for events.

4Fini produces events in North American and globally, and its Warped Tour has helped launch the careers of artists such as Eminem, Katy Perry, No Doubt, Echosmith, and Paramore.

4Fini Agency

In 2014, Kevin Lyman and business partner Jerra Spence created 4Fini Agency, a full service consulting firm connecting brands with the youth market.

Over the past 20 years, 4Fini has worked with youth-targeted brands including Monster Energy, Rockstar Energy, Vans, Hurley, Volcom, and retailers like Hot Topic, Journeys, and Tilly’s.

Long-term partners and sponsors include Ernie Ball (since 1996), Alternative Press (since 1999), Truth (since 2000), Trojan (partnership starting in 2000), Fuse (since 2004), and Kia (since 2008).

4Fini Productions

4Fini Productions is a live production house known for producing festivals, events, award shows, and concert tours worldwide.

In 2007, Kevin Lyman’s The Vans Warped Tour and its significance to the punk-rock/skate community was commemorated with a time capsule and exhibit at the Rock and Roll Hall of Fame and Museum. In 2019 the exhibit reopened which ran through March 2021.

In July 2014, 4Fini produced the annual AP Music Awards at The Rock and Roll Hall Of Fame Museum.

Awards
For his philanthropic efforts, Lyman was recognized as the Billboard Touring Awards Humanitarian of the Year (2009), an honoree at the Grammy/MusiCares MAP Fund gala (2011), and was inducted into the Top Dog Touring Hall of Fame at the Tour Link Conference (2012).

In 2009, Billboard awarded Lyman the Humanitarian Award for his philanthropic work, which has included founding the Unite the United Foundation, a charitable organization that has raised over $1 million for various non-profits.

In 2014, Lyman’s Vans Warped Tour attempted to set a Guinness World Record title for Largest Food Drive in 24-Hour period at a single location.  In 2013, the tour collected 33,000 pounds of food.

In 2016 Lyman was given the Humanitarian of the year award, by the Tj Martell foundation at their annual Family Day.

In 2018 Lyman was award Billboard's Humanitarian of the Year award for his work done with FEND and the national opioid crisis. 

In 2018 Lyman was inducted into the IEBA Hall of Fame with Joan Jett and Rod Essig of CAA.

Speaking engagements

Lyman has been a speaker at SXSW 2014, Vegas Music Summit 2014, Launch Music Conference 2014, ASCAP Expo 2014, Cutting Edge Music Business Conference, Billboard’s Mobile Entertainment Live!, and Digital Media Summit.

References 

Living people
Year of birth missing (living people)
American music people